Prince Mahidol Hall is a concert hall of Mahidol University and the largest concert hall of Thailand, located in Phutthamonthon District, Nakhon Pathom. The hall was named after Prince Mahidol Adulyadej.

The hall was inaugurated on 14 April 2014 by Princess Maha Chakri Sirindhorn and a performance by the Thailand Philharmonic Orchestra. The hall was also chosen by Tokyo Philharmonic Orchestra on its 100th Anniversary World Tour 2014 list. The architecture concept based on physical structure of human and plant. The roof has two layers in order to cut off a noise from outside, the inner layer covered with a distinctive material, the outer layer covered with copper.

References

External links 
 
 Official Website

Music venues in Thailand
Opera houses in Thailand
Music venues completed in 2014
2014 establishments in Thailand
Mahidol University
Buildings and structures in Nakhon Pathom province